Patrick Vieira (born 1976), is a French football manager and former midfielder

Patrick Vieira may also refer to:

Patrick Vieira (footballer, born 1991), Brazilian football fullback
Patrick Vieira (footballer, born 1992), Brazilian football attacking midfielder

See also
Patrick Videira (born 1977), French football manager and former midfielder